"When Love Goes Wrong" is a song by R&B band Earth, Wind & Fire, released as a single in 1997 on Rhino Records from the album In the Name of Love. It reached No. 33 on the Billboard Adult R&B Airplay chart.

Overview
When Love Goes Wrong was produced by Maurice White and composed by Philip Bailey, Andrew Klippel and Alan Glass. The song also came from Earth, Wind and Fire's 1997 studio album In the Name of Love.

Critical reception
David Stubbs of Uncut proclaimed "Philip Bailey shows he's chockful to the falsetto brim with the milk of human soulfulness" on the tune.
Geoffrey Himes of The Washington Post found that "on the slower romantic ballads such as When Love Goes Wrong and Cruising, Bailey's impossibly high tenor sounds as if it's in a permanent swoon.". 
Omoronke Idowu of Vibe called the song "a silky celestial ballad". Al Rasheed Dauda of Vox stated "Philip Bailey and his unrivalled falsetto blesses the ballads When Love Goes Wrong and Cruisin'. 
Steve Jones of USA Today also declared that "the mellow grooves of Cruisin' and When Love Goes Wrong showcase Philip Bailey's still brilliant falsetto".

Charts

References

1997 songs
1997 singles
Earth, Wind & Fire songs
Rhino Records singles
Songs written by Philip Bailey
Songs written by Andrew Klippel